3rd Brigade may refer to:

Australia
3rd Army Tank Brigade (Australia)
3rd Brigade (Australia)
3rd Light Horse Brigade

Canada
 3rd Canadian Infantry Brigade

Croatia
3rd Guards Brigade (Croatia)

France
3rd Mechanised Brigade (France)

India
British Indian Army in the First World War
 3rd (Abbottabad) Brigade
 3rd (Ambala) Cavalry Brigade
British Indian Army in the Second World War
 3rd (Meerut) Cavalry Brigade
 3rd Indian Infantry Brigade
 3rd Indian Motor Brigade

Japan
 IJA 3rd Cavalry Brigade

New Zealand
3rd (New Zealand Rifle) Brigade

Poland
3rd Brigade of the Polish Legions
3rd Polish Infantry Brigade
Polish 3rd Mountain Brigade

Serbia
LF 3rd Brigade

South Africa
 3rd Infantry Brigade (South Africa)

Spain
 3rd Mixed Brigade

Ukraine
 3rd Tank Brigade (Ukraine)
 3rd Separate Assault Brigade (Ukraine)

United Kingdom
3rd Cavalry Brigade (United Kingdom)
3 Commando Brigade
3rd Guards Brigade (United Kingdom)
3rd Infantry Brigade (United Kingdom)
3rd Mounted Brigade (United Kingdom)
3rd Parachute Brigade (United Kingdom)
 Artillery Brigades
 3rd Brigade Royal Field Artillery 
 III Brigade, Royal Horse Artillery
 III Brigade, Royal Horse Artillery (T.F.)

United States
3rd Brigade, 1st Infantry Division (United States)
3rd Brigade, 1st Cavalry Division (United States)
3rd Brigade, 7th Infantry Division (United States)
3rd Brigade Combat Team, 10th Mountain Division (United States)
3rd Brigade, 24th Infantry Division (United States)
3rd Brigade, 104th Division (United States)
3rd Marine Expeditionary Brigade (United States)
3rd Signal Brigade (United States)
3rd Sustainment Brigade (United States)